Serge Patrick Njoh Soko (born 31 November 1997) is a Cameroonian footballer who plays as a winger for Spanish club SD Huesca.

Club career
Soko played for local sides Union Douala and Astres FC before making his senior debut with Dominican side Cibao FC in 2016. In the following year, he joined Liga MX side Atlas.

In 2018, Soko moved to Atlante in the Ascenso MX. He signed for Mineros de Zacatecas in 2020, before joining Spanish Segunda División B side Racing de Santander on 23 September of that year.

Soko was a regular starter for the Verdiblancos, helping the side to win the 2021–22 Primera División RFEF. On 10 June 2022, he agreed to a two-year deal with SD Huesca in the Segunda División.

Career statistics

Club

References

External links

1997 births
Living people
Footballers from Douala
Cameroonian footballers
Association football wingers
Liga Dominicana de Fútbol players
Cibao FC players
Liga MX players
Ascenso MX players
Atlas F.C. footballers
Atlante F.C. footballers
Mineros de Zacatecas players
Primera Federación players
Segunda División B players
Racing de Santander players
SD Huesca footballers
Cameroonian expatriate footballers
Cameroonian expatriate sportspeople in Mexico
Cameroonian expatriate sportspeople in Spain
Expatriate footballers in the Dominican Republic
Expatriate footballers in Mexico
Expatriate footballers in Spain